Sungwadaga or Central Maewo, also known as Peterara after one of its dialects, is an Oceanic language spoken on Maewo, Vanuatu.

Phonology

Consonants

Vowels

References

External links 
 Materials on Karnai are included in the open access Arthur Capell collections (AC1 and AC2) held by Paradisec
 Digitised microfilm images from Pacific Manuscripts Bureau (PAMBU) are also available from Paradisec
 Na Ganigogona: A Liturgy for Melanesia in Maewo (c. 1975)

Penama languages
Languages of Vanuatu